Syed Iqbal Mian is a Pakistani politician who was a member of the Provincial Assembly of Khyber Pakhtunkhwa from August 2019 to January 2023.

Political career
Mian contested 2019 Khyber Pakhtunkhwa provincial election on 20 July 2019 from constituency PK-109 (Kurram-II) on the ticket of Pakistan Tehreek-e-Insaf. He won the election by the majority of 16,852 votes over the independent runner up Inayat Ali Toori. He garnered 38,549 votes while Toori received 21,697 votes.

References

Living people
Pakistan Tehreek-e-Insaf MPAs (Khyber Pakhtunkhwa)
Politicians from Khyber Pakhtunkhwa
Year of birth missing (living people)